Sonny Kiss (born December 11, 1993) is an American professional wrestler, dancer, and professional wrestling manager currently signed to All Elite Wrestling. Kiss wrestles in the men's division but identifies as genderfluid and prefers she/her pronouns. She began her career in 2011 as a manager and became a pro wrestler two years later. Her first national exposure took place in 2018, when she began to work with Lucha Underground under the ring name XO Lishus. When Lucha Underground ended, she signed with All Elite Wrestling in 2019.

Early life 
Sonny Kiss was born in Jersey City, New Jersey on December 11, 1993. Kiss attended a performing arts high school where she studied dance. In 2011, Kiss attended New Jersey Performing Arts Center (NJPAC)'s Summer Youth Performance Workshop (SYPW) modern dance program, which she successfully auditioned for. Later that year, Sonny won first place in Dance at the Hudson County Teen Arts Festival. In 2014, she attended an audition for the NY Jets Flight Crew.
 Prior to becoming a professional wrestler, Kiss worked as a background dancer and choreographer for indie artists during her teen years.

Professional wrestling career

Independent circuit; Lucha Underground (2011–2019) 
Sonny Kiss initially debuted as a manager/valet in November 2011 at the age of 17. In September 2013, Kiss made her in-ring debut at East Coast Pro Wrestling in New Jersey. Sonny later appeared on several wrestling promotions on the independent circuit such as Full Impact Pro and Evolve.

On June 27, 2018, Kiss made her debut on Lucha Underground as XO Lishus by defeating Jack Evans. On August 8, 2018, she teamed up with Ivelisse in a losing effort to Joey Ryan and Jack Evans. Sonny later won the rematch against Jack Evans in a No Mas Match on August 29 of that year. On September 29, Kiss had her first title match teaming up with Ivelisse and Joey Ryan for the Trios Title, losing to the Reptile Tribe (Luchasaurus, Daga and Kobra Moon). The trio went on to lose to the Rabbit Tribe (Paul London, El Bunny and The White Rabbit) two weeks later. Kiss and Ivelisse competed for the Trios Title at Ultima Lucha Cuatro with Sammy Guevara as their third partner. The trio lost to the Reptile Tribe on October 10, 2018.

All Elite Wrestling (2019–present) 
 
It was announced in February 2019 that Sonny Kiss had signed with All Elite Wrestling (AEW). At AEW's inaugural pay-per-view event Double or Nothing on May 25, Kiss competed in the 21-man Casino Battle Royale, but was eliminated by Tommy Dreamer. At Fight for the Fallen on July 13, Kiss defeated Peter Avalon, earning her first win in AEW.

Kiss then went on a six match losing streak between November 2019 and March 2020 on AEW Dark, both in single and tag team matches. On 24 March 2020, Kiss formed a tag team with Joey Janela when they beat Corey Hollis and Mike Reed. After a two-month absence, the pair returned to the ring on the May 26 edition of AEW Dark, when they defeated Brady Pierce and John Skyler. On the May 27, 2020 episode of Dynamite, Kiss participated in a battle royal match to determine the number one contender for the TNT Championship but was eliminated by Wardlow. The pairing of Sonny Kiss and Janela led to a vignette on AEW Dynamite, in which the pair beat up of wrestlers at the gas station. Kiss and Janela made their tag team debut on the June 24 edition of AEW Dynamite against The Dark Order's Brodie Lee and Colt Cabana, which they lost after Cabana pinned Janela.

At Fight for the Fallen on July 15, Kiss challenged Cody for the AEW TNT Championship, but lost. At the All Out event on September 5, Kiss participated in the Casino Battle Royale, where she eliminated Jake Hager (following their encounter three days before to the event) before was eliminated by Brian Cage. This led to Kiss and Janela facing Chris Jericho and Hager on the September 9 edition of AEW Dynamite in a No Disqualification Tag Team match, which they lost after Hager pinned Kiss, following a distraction from Jericho. On the 21 October edition of AEW Dynamite, Kiss was named as a replacement for Janela, who had withdrawn from a tournament to determine the number one contender for the AEW World Championship, but was eliminated in the first round by Kenny Omega. Throughout 2020 and 2021, Kiss often managed Joey Janela on AEW Dynamite against opponents Lance Archer, “Hangman” Adam Page, Chris Jericho, and Kenny Omega, to which Janela was unsuccessful.

In the beginning of 2021, there was growing dissension between Kiss and Janela when they embarked on losing streaks on AEW Dark matches, leading Janela to abandon Kiss. This led to the pair appearing in the Waiting Room with Britt Baker to settle the issues and they made amends. However, in the 9 August 2021 edition of AEW Dark: Elevation, Janela attacked Kiss prior to their tag team match, disbanding the team. Kiss then made her return on the 7 September 2021 edition of AEW Dark, where she attacked Janela following his match. Throughout the rest of 2021, both Kiss and Janela faced each other, where they each won once in two of their matches on AEW Dark: Elevation and AEW Dark to end their feud.

On 12 August 2022 of AEW Rampage, Kiss made a return to television in almost two years, losing in a squash match against Parker Boudreaux. On the same night following a match against Orange Cassidy and Ariya Daivari, Kiss rushed to the ring to save Orange Cassidy, only to give him a low blow and aligned with Ari Daivari, Slim J and Parker Boudreaux as part of a stable named The Trustbusters, turning heel for the first time in AEW.

Personal life 
In 2013, Kiss became a certified yoga instructor.

Kiss is genderfluid and transfeminine and identifies with both men's and women's pronouns. In February 2021, Kiss stated on Table Talk with Mo and D-Von Dudley: "Half the roster calls me ‘she’ and the other half calls me ‘he’; sometimes even in the same sentence, and I love it." Kiss uses the AEW women's locker room and also trains with the women's wrestlers while wrestling in the men's division. As of 2022, Kiss stated on Sessions with Renee Paquette that she much preferred the "she" and "her" pronouns outside of the ring and in real life, respectively, as it feels more natural. She stated, "When I get married, I'd want the guy to call me his 'wife'" and revealed she identified as transfeminine.

In November 2020, Kiss earned a Bachelor of Science in Exercise physiology.

On the podcast AEW Unrestricted, Kiss described herself as a "nostalgia junkie" and is a fan of various pop culture fads from the 1990s and early 2000s relating to fashion, gaming, television, and teen films along with boy bands, girl groups, and various forms of popular music. Kiss is an avid fan of rap metal band Limp Bizkit.

Kiss cites Rob Van Dam, Rey Mysterio, Trish Stratus, Lita, The Hardy Boyz, Jazz, Sharmell, Molly Holly, Victoria, Alicia Fox and Jacqueline along with mentors Dustin Rhodes, Chris Jericho, and Billy Gunn as major influences.

Kiss is straight edge and is a vegetarian.

Championships and accomplishments
American Championship Wrestling 
ACE Fight or Flight Champion (1 time)
East Coast Professional Wrestling
East Coast Light Heavyweight Championship (1 time)
 Pro Wrestling Illustrated
 Ranked No. 164 of the top 500 singles wrestlers in the PWI 500 in 2020
Tier 1 Wrestling
Tier 1 Championship (1 time)
Warriors of Wrestling
WOW Heavyweight Championship (1 time)
WOW No Limits Championship (1 time)
King of New York (2018)
Catalyst Wrestling Championship (1 time)

Notes

References

External links 

 
 
 

1993 births
21st-century African-American sportspeople
21st-century LGBT people
21st-century professional wrestlers
African-American dancers
African-American professional wrestlers
All Elite Wrestling personnel
American non-binary professional wrestlers
Exóticos
LGBT African Americans
LGBT Native Americans
LGBT people from New Jersey
LGBT professional wrestlers
American LGBT sportspeople
Living people
Native American professional wrestlers
People from Jersey City, New Jersey
Professional wrestlers from New Jersey
Genderfluid people